Edward Wild may refer to:

 Edward A. Wild (1825–1891), American homeopathic doctor and American Civil War general.
 Edward Wild (neuroscientist) (born 1978), British neurologist, neuroscientist, scientific outreach advocate; UCL Institute of Neurology
Edward Wild, actor in Well Done, Henry
Edward Wild, Conservative candidate in 2001 Ipswich by-election

See also
Edward Wilde, English politician